The Butil Farmers Party (Butil), formerly the Luzon Farmers Party, is a party-list in the Luzon, Philippines. Butil is the electoral wing of the National Farmers Supreme Council (SANDUGO).

In the 2004 elections for the House of Representatives got 429,259 votes (3.3742%) and one seat (Benjamin A. Cruz). In the previous congress the party had two seats, Benjamin A. Cruz and Leonila V. Chavez ('Ka Nellie').

The party supported the candidacy of Gloria Macapagal Arroyo in the 2004 election.

Cruz died on October 15, 2004. His seat was filled by Chavez. In the 14 May 2007 election, the party won one seat in the nationwide party-list vote.

Electoral performance

References

External links
 

Agrarian parties in the Philippines
Party-lists represented in the House of Representatives of the Philippines
Political parties established in 1998